Byambajavyn Javkhlantögs (born 23 October 1959) is a Mongolian wrestler. He competed in the men's Greco-Roman 48 kg at the 1976 Summer Olympics.

References

External links
 

1959 births
Living people
Mongolian male sport wrestlers
Olympic wrestlers of Mongolia
Wrestlers at the 1976 Summer Olympics
Place of birth missing (living people)